Binzhou is a prefecture-level city in Shandong, China.

Binzhou may also refer to:

 Binzhou, Shaanxi, county-level city

Towns
Binzhou, Heilongjiang, in Bin County
Binzhou, Guangxi, in Binyang County

Historical prefectures
Bin Prefecture (Guangxi), a prefecture between the 7th and 20th centuries in modern Guangxi
Bin Prefecture (Shaanxi), a prefecture between the 8th and 20th centuries in modern Shaanxi
Bin Prefecture (Shandong), a prefecture between the 10th and 20th centuries in modern Shandong

See also
Bin (disambiguation)